is a 2011 Japanese television Parody comedy about Yoshihiko, an inept hero who sets out to find the cure to a plague, but ends up fighting a larger evil. Yoshihiko is guided by a comedic Buddha, and accompanied by an incompetent wizard, a woman who wants to kill Yoshihiko because she thinks he killed her father, and a warrior who will kill Yoshihiko as soon as the warrior finishes telling Yoshihiko his stories. Yūsha Yoshihiko is heavily influenced by the RPG game series Dragon Quest, with Yoshihiko's outfit and most of the monsters being directly lifted from the series. It also contains references to other fantasy series and comedies, such as Monty Python.

The second season  was broadcast in 2012. The third season  was broadcast in 2016.

Plot
Yūsha Yoshihiko is a young, adventurous child who inevitably becomes The Hero Yoshihiko after the Hero Teruhiko, who went searching for a miracle herb to cure a plague which struck the village, never returned. He pulls a sacred sword from a stone within his village, which determines him as the next Hero. Due to these events, Yoshihiko must embark on a journey to the Evil King's castle to find a cure for the plague that has stricken his village. Along the way, he finds many new companions and allies, who help Yoshihiko reach his ultimate goal.

Characters

Yoshihiko
A young man of Kaboi Village who pulls the legendary Beckoning Sword from a boulder and becomes the Hero destined to defeat the Demon Lord. Dim-witted and overly trusting, Yoshihiko often aids enemies to the detriment of the party. He frequently abandons the quest to pursue unheroic goals, often to lust after recently-met women. Known to enter the homes of strangers and smash their pots, not understanding the angry reactions of the inhabitants. Yoshihiko is easily excited by magic — whenever he meets a magic-user, he insists on being the target of any spells they know.

Danjo
Middle-aged bandit who follows Yoshihiko in hopes of finishing a lengthy story he began telling, after which Danjo will kill him. Tall, strong and clad in animal hides, Danjo is a capable warrior who takes great pride in his sideburns. He serves as the pragmatic mentor of the group, although he sometimes gives into the vices of drinking and women.

Murasaki
A sour-tempered village girl who believes Yoshihiko murdered her father and wishes to kill him in revenge. Yoshihiko convinces her to put off killing him until they discover the truth of her father's murder (a subplot that is never again addressed). Murasaki develops a crush for Yoshihiko, although her feelings are not reciprocated — Yoshihiko is unimpressed by her unfeminine figure. Murasaki derides Merebu's magical abilities and the two often take jabs at each other, Merebu mocking her for her lack of curves, Murasaki making fun of the mole on his lip. Murasaki becomes a mage during visits to Dharma Shrine and learns a small number of useful spells. She carries an inanimate pet bird on her shoulder that is rarely mentioned but allegedly alive.

Merebu
The guru of a village, exposed as a fraudster by Yoshiko and company. Merebu joins the party to see the outside world. He learns at least one new magic spell per episode, putting on airs as he describes it to the party, but they are all underpowered cantrips that at best mildly inconvenience the enemy. Between this and his lack of physical prowess, most view Merebu as useless — the church only charges a few gold, or none at all, to revive him, whereas the revival prices for Danjo and Murasaki climb into the tens of thousands. However, Merebu is the most genre savvy character, demonstrating an understanding of modern pop culture, video game mechanics and the fact they are filming a television show. He does his best to keep the others from referencing copyrighted material, and often calls out the low-budget elements of the show.

Hotoke
An exalted Buddhist deity who, like God in Monty Python and the Holy Grail, appears in the clouds and gives the party tasks to carry out, although Yoshihiko is unable to see him without the aid of special glasses. Hotoke acts in a very un-Buddha-like manner, telling jokes, forgetting his lines and becoming tongue-tied, providing false or incomplete information, getting distracted by mundane trivialities, and cheats on his wife. Like Merebu, he often breaks the fourth wall by referring to the quest as a television show. Every once in a while, Hotoke is forced to restore Yoshihiko's motivation with a resolve-bolstering Buddha Beam.

Hisa
Yoshihiko's sister. A running gag, she emerges from behind a tree in the last few minutes of each episode to express concern for her brother. Sometimes attempts to sabotage the party's progress to keep Yoshihiko from getting hurt.

Episodes

Season 1: The Demon King's Castle (2011)

Season 2: The Key of the Evil Spirit (2012)

Season 3: The Seven Chosen Ones (2016)

Cast
Takayuki Yamada – Yoshihiko (Hero)
Azusa Okamoto – Hisa (Hero's Sister)
Shin Takuma – Danjo (Warrior)
Haruka Kinami – Murasaki (Fighter)
Tsuyoshi Muro – Merebu (Wizard)
Jirô Satô – Hotoke (Buddha)
Kitarô – Teruhiko
Kôtarô Shiga – Ozaru
Ryôji Isoyama – Caveman
Kôji Nomura – Caveman
Narushi Ikeda – Ninja
Naomi Shiraishi – Obaba
Naomi Watanabe – Oshina
Tomoya Nakamura – Sauda
Nobue Iketani – Sauda's Mother
Yûichi Fukuda – Mountain God
Ken Yasuda – Thief A
Daisuke Kobayashi – Kojima
Nana Rokusha – Kirana Village Woman
Meikyô Yamada – Gantesai
Kôji Abe – Thief B
Eiko Koike – Angel
Takafumi Ozeki – Kappa
Ikki Sawamura – Thief
Shin'ya Kaneko – Nakamo
Hidekazu Nagae – Igaruya
Hajime Taniguchi – Shimuda
Arata Furuta – Thief E
Haruna Uechi – Thief E's Wife
Takuma Oto'o – Thief F
Shizuka Nakamura – Lienne
Junpei Takiguchi – Evil Sorcerer
Takao Toji – Old Man Lienne
Tanaka Naoki – Sir Morgan
Shun Oguri – Baquas, the Demon King's gatekeeper (Season 1, ep 10)

Music
The opening to the first series was performed by mihimaru GT, while the closing credits is by TEE. The audio was composed by anime and video game composer Eishi Segawa. A soundtrack CD was bundled with the first series DVD. A new release containing additional tracks from the other seasons was sold separately in 2017.

References

External links

2011 Japanese television series debuts
2012 in Japanese television
2016 in Japanese television
Television about magic
Comedy-drama television series
Television shows about video games
Adventure television series
Television shows written by Yûichi Fukuda